Folkyo is the third studio album by Canadian singer-songwriter Dayna Manning, released on her own LeParc Records on December 19, 2006. Folkyo received positive reviews, praising the album's musical intricacy and Manning's voice and writing, as well as its complex tones and clever lyrics.

Overview

Production
After eight years Manning parted ways with EMI. Her third album, Folkyo, was released on December 19, 2006, and saw Manning write, co-produce, engineer and perform. She released the album on her own label, LeParc Records, and even raised funds to finish production by working at a construction camp in Northern British Columbia for the Winter of 2006. Collaborators included Ian Brown from Matthew Good Band and Christian Thor-Valdson from Copyright.

Reception
Folkyo received positive reviews, praising the album's musical intricacy and Manning's voice and writing, as well as its complex tones and clever lyrics.

According to a Toronto Quarterly article in 2012, "[Manning's] songwriting is sincere and superbly crafted, her finger-picking skills are unmatched and her voice is truly unmistakable with a timbre that reminds one of Roy Forbes, Joni Mitchell and Dolly Parton all at once."

Personnel

Dayna Manning – write, co-produce, engineer and perform
Gavin Bradley – Engineer, Keyboards, Piano, producer, Programming
Ashton Price – Engineer, Guitar, producer
Siegfried Meier – Producer, engineer, mastering, mixing

References

External links
DaynaManning.com
Full Credits at Allmusic

Dayna Manning albums
2006 albums
Albums produced by Siegfried Meier